Al-Fida Saida Sports Club, also known as Al-Fida Club (Arabic: نادي الفداء الرياضي) is a Lebanese Basketball club based in Saida, in Lebanon-Div.2 League. Where both old and young players can play in the team.

A lot of young players reached the Div A. of the league from the team held by Sporting Al Riyadi Beirut and other teams.

Notable former players 
 Hussein Tawbe
 Abdallah Hijazi

References

Basketball teams in Lebanon
Sidon District